Vilas Vincent Vawter III, better known as Vince Vawter, is an American-born author and illustrator. He worked in the newspaper business for forty years, retiring with the title of president and publisher of the Evansville (Ind.) Courier & Press. His debut novel Paperboy received a Newbery Honor in 2014.

Bibliography
 Paperboy (2013)
 Copyboy (2014)

References

American young adult novelists
Living people
Year of birth missing (living people)